Maccabi Ironi Rehovot is a professional basketball club based in Rehovot in central Israel. The team plays in the Liga Artzit.

History
Maccabi Rehovot was founded in 1950 and played in the Liga Artzit (the third-tier division). During the nineties, Rehovot was coached by Moti Aroesti, a former Maccabi Tel Aviv player, and played in the Liga Leumit.

In the 2015–16 season, Rehovot was promoted to the Liga Leumit for the first time in 17 years.

In the 2017–18 season, Rehovot reached the Liga Leumit Semifinals as the third seed but eventually lost to Maccabi Kiryat Gat.

In the 2018–19 season, Rehovot have been relegated to the Liga Artzit, the third tier of the Israeli Basketball.

Season by season

References

External links
Facebook page 
Eurobasket page

Basketball teams in Israel
Sport in Rehovot
Basketball teams established in 1950
1950 establishments in Israel